Coming Soon may refer to:

Films
 Coming Soon (1982 film), documentary film
 Coming Soon (1999 film), American romantic comedy film
 Coming Soon (1999 TV film), three part comedy drama, directed by Annie Griffin
 Coming Soon (2008 film), Thai horror film
 Coming Soon (2014 film), Turkish film

Music
 Coming Soon (French band), a French indie band
 Coming Soon (Latvian band), a rock band from Liepaja, Latvia
 "Coming Soon" (song), a track on the 1980 Queen album The Game

Other uses
 Coming Soon!!!, a 2001 novel by John Barth
 ComingSoon.net, an entertainment website owned by CraveOnline